Bảo Lạc is a rural district of Cao Bằng province in the Northeast region of Vietnam. As of 2019 the district had a population of 54,420. The district covers an area of 919 km2. The district capital lies at Bảo Lạc.

Administrative divisions
Bảo Lạc District consists of the district capital, Bảo Lạc, and 16 communes: Sơn Lộ, Đình Phùng, Hưng Đạo, Huy Giáp, Hồng An, Xuân Trường, Khánh Xuân, Phan Thanh, Hồng Trị, Cô Ba, Bảo Toàn, Cốc Pàng, Thượng Hà, Hưng Thịnh, Sơn Lập and Kim Cúc.

References

Districts of Cao Bằng province